Alon Brumer, (born 5 November 1973) is an Israeli former professional footballer who played for Maccabi Tel Aviv and Hapoel Ironi Rishon LeZion.

Brumer now works as the manager of Hapoel Hod HaSharon.

Honours
Israeli Premier League (2):
1994–95, 1995–96
Israel State Cup (2):
1994, 1996

Personal life
Alon's twin brother Gadi was a defender; the two played together at Maccabi Tel Aviv for nine seasons.

External links

1973 births
Living people
Israeli Jews
Israeli footballers
Maccabi Tel Aviv F.C. players
Hapoel Rishon LeZion F.C. players
Association football defenders
Israel international footballers
Israeli football managers
Soccer players from Johannesburg
Israeli twins
Twin sportspeople